Fish Camp (formerly Happy Camp and Berry's Fish Camp) is a census-designated place in Mariposa County, California, United States. The population was 49 at the 2020 census. The ZIP Code is 93623, and the community is inside area code 559.

The Fish Camp post office opened in 1924, closed in 1933, and re-opened in 1939. The name comes from a fish hatchery at the place.

Geography
It is the site of the Yosemite Mountain Sugar Pine Railroad, a heritage tourist line, and Tenaya Lodge, a resort owned by Delaware North. About 1 mile north of the community is the Summerdale campground, the original location of Fish Camp.

The community is in the valley of Big Creek, which flows north into Yosemite National Park, where it joins the South Fork of the Merced River near Wawona.

Climate
This region experiences warm (but not hot) and dry summers, with no average monthly temperatures above .  According to the Köppen Climate Classification system, Fish Camp has a warm-summer Mediterranean climate, abbreviated "Csb" on climate maps.

Demographics

The 2010 United States Census reported that Fish Camp had a population of 59. The racial makeup of Fish Camp was 57 (96.6%) White, 0 (0.0%) African American, 0 (0.0%) Native American, 1 (1.7%) Asian, 0 (0.0%) Pacific Islander, 0 (0.0%) from other races, and 1 (1.7%) from two or more races. Hispanic or Latino of any race were 3 persons (5.1%).

The Census reported that 59 people (100% of the population) lived in households, 0 (0%) lived in non-institutionalized group quarters, and 0 (0%) were institutionalized.

There were 31 households, of which 4 (12.9%) had children under the age of 18 living in them, 12 (38.7%) were opposite-sex married couples living together, 1 (3.2%) had a female householder with no husband present, 1 (3.2%) had a male householder with no wife present. There were 1 (3.2%) unmarried opposite-sex partnerships, and 0 (0%) same-sex married couples or partnerships. 13 households (41.9%) were made up of individuals, and 6 (19.4%) had someone living alone who was 65 years of age or older. The average household size was 1.90. There were 14 families (45.2% of all households); the average family size was 2.57.

9 people (15.3%) were under the age of 18, 4 people (6.8%) aged 18 to 24, 6 people (10.2%) aged 25 to 44, 26 people (44.1%) aged 45 to 64, and 14 people (23.7%) who were 65 years of age or older. The median age was 49.2 years. For every 100 females, there were 90.3 males.  For every 100 females age 18 and over, there were 117.4 males.

The homeowner vacancy rate was 4.8%; the rental vacancy rate was 0%. 35 people (59.3% of the population) lived in owner-occupied housing units and 24 people (40.7%) lived in rental housing units.

References

Census-designated places in Mariposa County, California
Populated places in the Sierra Nevada (United States)